Yvonne Prettner Solon (born February 3, 1946) is an American politician who served as the 47th lieutenant governor of Minnesota, from 2011 to 2015. She is the sixth consecutive woman to serve in that capacity and is a member of the Democratic-Farmer-Labor Party. She served with Governor Mark Dayton, who successfully ran for reelection, while she chose to retire at the end of her term.

Education
Prettner Solon completed her secondary education at Stanbrook Hall Preparatory School, a Roman Catholic school for girls in Duluth, Minnesota. She received a B.S.D. and a M.A. from the University of Minnesota Duluth.

State Senate
Prettner Solon was a member of the Minnesota Senate representing District 7, which includes portions of St. Louis County in the northeastern part of the state. She was first elected in a January 2002 special election held after the death of her husband, Senator Sam Solon, on December 28, 2001. She was reelected in 2002 and 2006. Her special legislative concerns included economic development, education, health care, the environment, transportation, and jobs.

Committees
Prettner Solon was a member of the Senate's Capital Investment Committee, the Commerce and Consumer Protection Committee, the Energy, Utilities, Technology and Communications Committee (which she chairs), and the Health, Housing and Family Security Committee. She also served on the Finance Subcommittee for the Health and Human Services Budget Division.

Lieutenant Governor

On May 24, 2010, gubernatorial candidate and former U.S. Senator Mark Dayton announced that Prettner Solon would be his lieutenant governor running mate in the 2010 election. In choosing her, Dayton said that "her thoughtful, sensitive and visionary leadership and public service are further informed by her life experiences, which have forged a woman I deeply respect and admire." Her selection was seen as bringing balance to the Dayton campaign.

On August 10, 2010, the Dayton-Prettner Solon ticket narrowly defeated Margaret Anderson Kelliher to earn the DFL nomination and a spot in the November general election. After a close election that included a recount, Dayton and Prettner Solon defeated Republican nominees Tom Emmer and Annette Meeks in the November general election.

Electoral history

See also

List of female lieutenant governors in the United States

References

External links

Senator Prettner Solon Web Page
Minnesota Public Radio Votetracker: Senator Prettner Solon
Iron Range Resources Board Profile: Yvonne Prettner Solon - Fall 2008 p.7

1946 births
Living people
Politicians from Minneapolis
American people of German descent
Lieutenant Governors of Minnesota
Politicians from Duluth, Minnesota
Democratic Party Minnesota state senators
Women state legislators in Minnesota
21st-century American politicians
21st-century American women politicians
University of Minnesota Duluth alumni